William Bruce Calverley (21 January 1918 – 14 May 1961) was an Australian rules footballer who played with Fitzroy in the Victorian Football League (VFL).

Prior to establishing himself in the VFL he won the 1938 Gardiner Medal for the best player in the reserves competition. He played 89 games for Fitzroy, the most important being in the 1944 Grand Final win where he played on the wing.

References

External links

2004 obituary of Maurie Hearn, mentioning Clen Denning and Laurie Bickerton as the surviving members of the Maroons' 1944 side

1918 births
Fitzroy Football Club players
Fitzroy Football Club Premiership players
Australian rules footballers from Victoria (Australia)
1961 deaths
One-time VFL/AFL Premiership players